Ublituximab, sold under the brand name Briumvi, is an immunomodulator used for the treatment of multiple sclerosis. It is a CD20-directed cytolytic monoclonal antibody.

The most common adverse reactions include infusion reactions, including fever, chills, headache, influenza-like illness, elevated heart rate, nausea, throat irritation, reddening of the skin (erythema) and an anaphylactic (allergic) reaction; infections including serious and fatal bacterial, fungal, and new or reactivated viral infections and reduction in immunoglobulins.

It was approved for medical use in the United States in December 2022.

Medical uses 
Ublituximab is indicated for the treatment of relapsing forms of multiple sclerosis.

History 
Researchers demonstrated the efficacy of ublituximab in two randomized, double-blind, double-dummy, parallel group, active comparator-controlled clinical trials of identical design, in participants with relapsing forms of multiple sclerosis treated for 96 weeks. Participants were randomized to receive either ublituximab or teriflunomide, the active comparator. The primary outcome of both studies was the annualized relapse rate over the treatment period. In both studies, ublituximab significantly lowered the annualized relapse rate compared to teriflunomide.

Society and culture

Names 
Ublituximab is the international nonproprietary name (INN).

References

Further reading

External links 
 
 

Monoclonal antibodies
Orphan drugs